Nat Boxer (June 22, 1925 – December 3, 2009) was an American sound engineer. He won an Academy Award for Best Sound for the film Apocalypse Now.

Selected filmography
 Apocalypse Now (1979)

References

External links

1925 births
2009 deaths
20th-century American engineers
American audio engineers
Best Sound BAFTA Award winners
Best Sound Mixing Academy Award winners
Engineers from New York (state)
People from Rosendale, New York
People from Wawarsing, New York